Walk of Fame (Romanian: Aleea Celebrităților) is a project organized by Cocor and Metropolis Theater. The actors thus honored receive a star on the boulevard in Time Square (Romanian: Piața Timpului), in Bucharest, Romania. The criterion for choosing actors depends on the month in which they were born. The project is similar to the Hollywood Walk of Fame, in Los Angeles, United States. The Walk of Fame was inaugurated on January 31, 2011.

List of honored actors

Florin Piersic (b. 1936) – January 31, 2011
Victor Rebengiuc (b. 1933) – February 10, 2011
Radu Beligan (1918–2016) – March 27, 2011
Amza Pellea (1931–1983) – April 7, 2011
Maia Morgenstern (b. 1962) – May 1, 2011
Alexandru Tocilescu (1946–2011) – July 7, 2011
Tamara Buciuceanu (1929-2019) – September 4, 2011
Sebastian Papaiani (1936–2016) – September 29, 2011
Ileana Stana-Ionescu (b. 1936) – September 29, 2011 
Draga Olteanu Matei (1933-2020) – October 29, 2011
Mircea Albulescu (1934–2016) – October 29, 2011
Mariana Mihuț (b. 1942) – November 27, 2011
Stela Popescu (1935–2017) – December 14, 2011
Ion Caramitru (1942-2021) – March 29, 2012
Ștefan Iordache (1941–2008) – April 9, 2012
Iurie Darie (1929–2012) – June 1, 2012
Marin Moraru (1937–2016) – June 1, 2012
Ion Luca Caragiale (1852–1912) – June 9, 2012
Horațiu Mălăele (b. 1952) – August 2, 2012
George Mihăiță (b. 1948) – October 20, 2012
Costel Constantin (b. 1942) – October 20, 2012
Liviu Ciulei (1923–2011) – December 13, 2012
Ion Lucian (1924–2012) – December 13, 2012
Emil Hossu (1941–2012) – December 13, 2012
Șerban Ionescu (1950–2012) – December 13, 2012
Alexandru Arșinel (b. 1939) – May 30, 2015
Ion Dichiseanu (1933-2021) – May 30, 2015
Sergiu Nicolaescu (1930–2013) – May 30, 2015
Valeria Seciu (b. 1939) – June 27, 2015
Ion Besoiu (1931–2017) – June 27, 2015
Rodica Mandache (b. 1943) – June 27, 2015
Florina Cercel (1943-2019) – March 5, 2016
Adela Mărculescu (b. 1938) – March 5, 2016
Rodica Popescu Bitănescu (b. 1938) – March 5, 2016
Dem Rădulescu (1931–2000) – March 27, 2016
George Constantin (1933–1994) – March 27, 2016
Ștefan Bănică Sr. (1933–1995) – March 27, 2016
Dinu Manolache (1955–1998) – March 27, 2016

See also
List of halls and walks of fame#Walks of fame

References

Bucharest
Culture in Bucharest
Halls of fame in Romania
Awards established in 2011
Tourist attractions in Bucharest
Entertainment halls of fame